Velichka Pandeva (born 10 January 1942) is a Bulgarian cross-country skier. She competed in three events at the 1968 Winter Olympics.

References

External links
 

1942 births
Living people
Bulgarian female cross-country skiers
Olympic cross-country skiers of Bulgaria
Cross-country skiers at the 1968 Winter Olympics
Place of birth missing (living people)